Magudikkaran is a 1994 Tamil-language drama film directed by Yaar Kannan. The film stars Sarath Kumar in a guest appearance, while newcomers Dev Anand, Devi and Chithra play the lead roles. It was released on 25 November 1994.

Cast
Sarath Kumar as Raja's father (guest appearance)
Chithra as Thangam
Dev Anand as Raja
Devi
Anandaraj
Senthil
K. Prabhakaran
Vijay Krishnaraj 
Pradeep Jupiter
Jeevan
Nasim

Soundtrack

The film score and the soundtrack were composed by Deva. The soundtrack released in 1994.

References

1994 films
1990s Tamil-language films
Indian drama films
Films scored by Deva (composer)